Peperomia wernerrauhii is a species of tuberous geophyte in the genus Peperomia. It is endemic to the country of Peru and was discovered in Peru by Guillermo Pino and Marie-Stéphanie Samain. It primarily grows in dry tropical biome.

Etymology
Peperomia wernerrauhii came from a renowned German botanist and biologist named Werner Rauh. He has been on an expedition in Peru since 1967.

See also
Werner Rauh

References

wernerrauhii
Flora of South America
Flora of Peru